Praise the Fallen (also known as PTF2012) is the second studio album by the alternative electronic band VNV Nation, released in 1998. It is a departure from their debut album’s sound, featuring better production values, being more melodic, and containing a heavier electronic pace. "Solitary" was released as an EP, and "Honour" was re-recorded in 2003 and released as a single. The album peaked at #94 on the CMJ Radio 200 and #29 on the CMJ RPM Charts in the U.S.

Track listing

Notes
 “PTF2012” was originally thought to be a reference to the Mayan Calendar doomsday, 21 December 2012. Although in the booklet for Reformation 1 Ronan Harris states that the date was chosen at random.
 “Schweigeminute” is just one minute of silence.
 On “Forsaken”, The first line; "For thirty years, I have plotted to bring down the party. I am sick in mind and body" is a direct reference from the movie adaption of George Orwell's 1984. The last line in the song “If you’re frightened of dying, and you’re holding on — you’ll see devils tearing your life away. If you made your peace — then the devils are really angels, freeing you from the Earth” is from the movie Jacob’s Ladder and is spoken by Danny Aiello.
 Ronan Harris often refers to Praise the Fallen as a way of self-help through a difficult time of his life — in particular the track “Forsaken”, of which a vocal version was recorded for Solitary EP. This version, when sung live, is an emotional experience for Ronan, and he has been known to break down in tears.

References

1998 albums
VNV Nation albums